Osvaldo E. Fumo (born July 27, 1965) is an American politician and former Democratic member of the Nevada Assembly. He represented the 21st district, which covers parts of the southern Las Vegas Valley. He is currently a candidate for District attorney of Clark County, Nevada.

Biography
Fumo was born in Arlington, Virginia in 1965, the son of an Italian immigrant, and moved to Nevada in 1976. He graduated from Bishop Gorman High School in 1983 and from the University of San Diego in 1987. Fumo received his Juris Doctor from Whittier Law School in 1995, and practices law with the firm Pitaro & Fumo.

Fumo ran for the Assembly in 2016, prevailing in a three-candidate Democratic primary and defeating incumbent Derek Armstrong.

On November 3, 2020, Fumo unsuccessfully ran to become a justice on the Nevada Supreme Court.

Personal life
Fumo and his wife, Ellen, have 5 children: Genevieve, Veronica, Gabriella, Scott, and Stephanie.

Political positions
Fumo supports raising the minimum wage to at least $12.

He supports ending Capital punishment in Nevada, and ending the school-to-prison pipeline. He cites the disproportionate use against people of color and high fiscal impact of capital punishment as reasons for its abolition.

Electoral history

References

External links
 
 Campaign website
 Legislative website

1965 births
Living people
21st-century American politicians
Bishop Gorman High School alumni
Democratic Party members of the Nevada Assembly
Nevada lawyers
People from Arlington County, Virginia
Politicians from Las Vegas
University of San Diego alumni
Whittier Law School alumni
American people of Italian descent